Rainbow Studios is an American video game developer based in Phoenix, Arizona, best known for developing offroad racing games, such as Motocross Madness and the MX vs. ATV series. It was established by Earl Jarred in 1986 under the name Rainbow Multimedia Group and rebranded as Rainbow Studios in 1992. In January 2002, the company was acquired by THQ, under the ownership of which it was renamed THQ Digital Studios Phoenix in February 2010 and closed in August 2011. The studio was re-instated as Rainbow Studios in 2013 by Nordic Games (later known as THQ Nordic), a publishing company that had purchased most assets of the then-bankrupt THQ earlier that year.

History 
Rainbow Studios, originally named Rainbow Multimedia Group, was founded by Earl Jarred in 1986. In 1992, the company shifted its focus towards developing video games and was rebranded Rainbow Studios. On November 8, 2001, video game publisher THQ announced that it had agreed to acquire the studio in exchange for 1 million shares of common stock. An agreement of merger was signed between the two companies on December 21, 2001, and THQ announced that the deal had been completed on January 3, 2002, at which point THQ had issued 858,203 shares and expected to issue further 106,259 at a later point in time. In 2005, Jarred, alongside vice chairman Jeff Padden and employees Rick Baltman and Robb Rinard, left Rainbow Studios to form a new video game studio, 2XL Games. Three further Rainbow Studios veterans—Brad Ruminer, Dennis Booth, and Glenn O'Bannon—announced the formation of their studio, TimeFly Studios, in April 2008.

In mid-April 2008, Rainbow Studios laid off a team of 30 people working on an unannounced game. Because the team was "a minority" in the studio's multi-team setup, development on the game was able to continue despite the staff reduction. Further layoffs were instigated in November 2008 and February 2009 as part of larger restructurings within THQ. To push THQ's vision for digitally distributed games as part of its core portfolio, effective on February 3, Rainbow Studios and sister studio Juice Games were rebranded as THQ Digital Studios Phoenix and THQ Digital Studios Warrington, respectively. As a result of the restructuring, both studios collectively lost 60 employees. On August 9, 2011, THQ announced that, as part of another larger restructuring, THQ Digital Studios Phoenix would be closed down. The closure led to the elimination of 48 jobs at the Phoenix studio. THQ planned to retain a quality assurance department on-site.

THQ later filed for bankruptcy, and many of its assets, including the Rainbow Studios-developed MX vs. ATV franchise, were auctioned off to publisher Nordic Games (later known as THQ Nordic) in 2013. As Nordic Games planned to start developing new titles in that franchise, the company opted to resurrect Rainbow Studios under the former name and in its former location. The move was announced in December that year, at which point the new Rainbow Studios had hired many people previously employed by the former Rainbow Studios, including Ken George, Dave Dwire, Mike Mamula, Brad Bowling, Scott Hofmann, Justin Walsh, David Knudsen, and Lenore Gilbert. By June 2019, Rainbow Studios had 41 employees. As of October 2019, Gilbert serves as Rainbow Studios' chief executive officer.

Games developed

References

External links 
 

1986 establishments in Arizona
2002 mergers and acquisitions
2011 disestablishments in Arizona
2013 establishments in Arizona
American companies established in 1986
American subsidiaries of foreign companies
Companies based in Phoenix, Arizona
Re-established companies
THQ Nordic divisions and subsidiaries
Video game companies disestablished in 2011
Video game companies established in 1986
Video game companies established in 2013
Video game companies of the United States
Video game development companies